Live at the Isle of Wight is the fourth album and second live album by Irish rock band Taste, released in 1971. It was recorded live at the Isle of Wight Festival 1970 and released after the band broke up. The same performance of "Sinner Boy" was also used in the documentary film Message to Love.

Track listing
All tracks composed by Rory Gallagher except where indicated
"What's Going On" – 5:41
"Sugar Mama" (Traditional; arranged by Rory Gallagher) – 10:18
"Morning Sun" – 4:31
"Sinner Boy" – 5:31
"I Feel So Good" (Big Bill Broonzy) – 10:10
"Catfish" (Traditional; arranged by Rory Gallagher) – 14:26

Personnel
Taste
Rory Gallagher – guitars, vocals, harmonica
Richard "Charlie" McCracken – bass guitar
John Wilson – drums

Notes

1971 live albums
Taste (band) albums
Polydor Records live albums